The Philippine hawk-cuckoo (Hierococcyx pectoralis) is a bird belonging to the cuckoo family. It is found only in the Philippines. It was formerly classified as a subspecies of Hodgson's hawk-cuckoo (H. fugax) but is now commonly treated as a separate species based on differences in vocalizations.

It is a medium-sized cuckoo, about 29 centimetres in length. The adult is dark-grey above and white below with a pale rufous breast and upper belly. The tail has three or four black and buff bars, a broad black band near the tip and a pale rufous tip. There is a bare yellow ring around the eye. The legs and feet are also yellow and the bill is black and olive. Immature birds have rufous barring above and brown streaks below.

The bird has a high-pitched call of five to seven notes. The call lasts for about 1.5 seconds and is repeated up to 10 times, becoming louder and faster.

It is found on most of the larger islands of the Philippines, occurring up to 2,300 metres above sea-level. It inhabits forest and forest edge where it forages from near the ground up to the treetops. It is an uncommon bird and is usually shy and difficult to see. Its breeding season begins in April.

References

Fisher, Tim & Hicks, Nigel (2000) A Photographic Guide to Birds of the Philippines, New Holland, London.
Kennedy, Robert S.; Gonzales, Pedro C,; Dickinson, Edward C.; Miranda, Hector C. & Fisher, Timothy H. (2000) A Guide to the Birds of the Philippines, Oxford University Press, Oxford.
Peterson, Alan P. (ed.) (1999) Zoological Nomenclature Resource (Zoonomen). Accessed 22/08/07.

Philippine hawk-cuckoo
Endemic birds of the Philippines
Philippine hawk-cuckoo